John Phyland Brereton (8 October 1934 – 17 April 2021) was an Australian rules footballer who played with Footscray in the Victorian Football League (VFL).

Notes

External links 		

1934 births
Australian rules footballers from Victoria (Australia)
Western Bulldogs players
2021 deaths